Karad Dayasinah (also known as Akrad Dayasinah or Akrad Dasnieh, also known as Shamah) is a village in northern Syria, administratively part of the Homs District, located northwest of Homs. According to the Syria Central Bureau of Statistics (CBS), Karad Dayasinah had a population of 2,028 in the 2004 census. Its inhabitants are predominantly Sunni Muslims of Turkmen descent.

References

Populated places in Homs District
Turkmen communities in Syria